Kupası is the Turkish word for Cup, may refer to:

Başbakanlık Kupası (Northern Cyprus), the tournament of the Cyprus Turkish Football Federation
Cumhurbaşkanlığı Kupası, supercup tournament of the Cyprus Turkish Football Federation
Dr. Fazıl Küçük Kupası, the tournament of the Cyprus Turkish Football Federation
Federasyon Kupası, the top knockout tournament of the Cyprus Turkish Football Federation
Türkiye Kupası 2003-04, the 42nd edition of the annual Turkish Cup
Türkiye Kupası 2004-05, the 43rd edition of the annual Turkish Cup
Türkiye Kupası 2005-06, the 44th edition of the annual Turkish Cup
Türkiye Kupası 2007–08, the 45th edition of the annual Turkish Cup
Türkiye Kupası 2007-08, the 46th edition of the annual Turkish Cup
Türkiye Kupası 2008–09, the 47th season of Turkey's annual cup competition

See also
Football in Turkey - For complete list of Football Cup in Turkey